Rhoden is a surname. Notable people with the surname include:

Christian Rhoden (born 1974), German high jumper
Dwight Rhoden, American choreographer
George Rhoden (born 1926), Jamaican athlete
Hermann Rhodén (born 1993), Norwegian footballer
Jared Rhoden (born 1999), American basketball player
John Rhoden (1918-2001), American sculptor
Larry Rhoden (born 1959), American politician
Phil Rhoden (born 1945), Australian rules footballer
Philip Rhoden (1914-2003), Australian army officer
Rick Rhoden (born 1953), American golfer and former baseball player
Rudolf Klein-Rhoden (1871–1936), German actor
Shawn Rhoden (1975-2021), Jamaican-born American bodybuilder
Wayne Rhoden, Jamaican singer
William C. Rhoden, American sports journalist